Han Sang-Woon  (born 30 May 1986) is a retired South Korean football forward.

Career
He joined Busan I'Park by 2009 K-League draft. He scored 2 goals in 23 appearances in his first season. In the 2011 season, he showed better performance than his previous seasons and made many impressive goals. He scored 9 goals and had 7 assists at 28 appearances in this season.

On 30 December 2011, he moved to Seongnam Ilhwa Chunma from his first professional club Busan.

Club statistics

International career
Han was called national team in 2014 WCQ match against Lebanon (2 September 2011) and Kuwait (6 September 2011) but didn't play the games.

References

External links 

1986 births
Living people
Association football forwards
South Korean footballers
South Korean expatriate footballers
South Korea international footballers
Busan IPark players
Seongnam FC players
Júbilo Iwata players
Ulsan Hyundai FC players
Gimcheon Sangmu FC players
Busan Transportation Corporation FC players
K League 1 players
K League 2 players
K3 League players
J1 League players
Expatriate footballers in Japan
South Korean expatriate sportspeople in Japan
Dankook University alumni
People from Taebaek
Sportspeople from Gangwon Province, South Korea